Kheshig (Mongolian: Khishig, Keshik, Khishigten for "favored", "blessed") were the imperial guard for Mongol royalty in the Mongol Empire, particularly for rulers like Genghis Khan and his wife Börte. Their primary purpose was to act as bodyguards for the emperors and other important nobles. They were divided into two groups: the day guard (Torguud) and the night guard (Khevtuul). They were distinct from the regular army and would not go to battle with them, instead staying back on guard duty. Their supreme commander was called the Cherbi.

Because the Mongol Empire spanned most of Eurasia, its impacts on Mongol controlled-areas led to the creation of imperial guards like the Keshik. Kheshig was the term used for the palace guards of the Mughal emperors in India, and also for the matchlocks and sabres, which were changed weekly from Akbar the Great's armoury for the royal use. The royal guards in Persia who watched the King's person at night were also called Keshikchi.

History
The assassination of the leaders of rival Mongol tribes was a common occurrence thanks to the ever-shifting loyalties and conflicting interests at play within Mongol tribal politics. The father of Genghis Khan, Yesugei, for example, was unwittingly poisoned by one of his enemies. The risk was especially high at night since the ger that Mongol nomads traditionally sleep in lacked a solid wall, and so a sword or spear could easily penetrate the walls and kill the subject inside. As a result, the Mongol monarch in Mongolia typically had personal guards. The Kerait khan Toghoril (Wang Khan) had an imperial guard, Torguud. According to an oral tradition, their descendants could be Torghut people. After the defeat of Wang Khan in 1203, Genghis established the kheshig. The kheshig consisted mainly of sworn personal followers.

At first, this consisted of 70 day guards (Torguud or tunghaut) and 80 night guards (khevtuul). During the reign of Genghis, it seems to have been divided into four groups, commanded by the four generals Mukhulai, Chormaqan, Bo'orchu and Borokhula. Members of the kheshig outranked almost any other military officers in the Mongol Empire. As it was extremely well paid, the vocation was a popular one, and the numbers of Kheshig grew rapidly, to the extent that they were only normally on duty for three days in succession. In light of this, the word kheshig refers favor or blessing in the Mongolian language. Membership in the kheshig was regarded as a supreme honor and was an alternative to the necessity of hostage taking for noblemen. In the early days the guard was composed of 1,000 men. By the middle of Genghis Khan's reign, they had expanded to a tumen (10,000 men) commanded by Nayagha, an uncle of Bayan of the Baarin.

The Kheshig was originally consisted Mongolian, Manchurian, Han and Kazakh. As the Empire expanded rapidly, Genghis Khan's successors recruited Persian, Georgian, Armenian, Alan, Korean, Italian and Russian units. Since the kheshig was personal appanage of a monarch, his successors did not inherit them. Instead, the kheshigs of deceased Emperors took care of their lords' families and assisted households. But Güyük Khan took most of his father Ögedei's old kheshig.

For his own bodyguards Kublai Khan retained the use of the traditional Mongol Keshig. Kublai created a new Imperial guard force, the suwei, of which half were Chinese and the other half ethnically mixed. By the 1300s even the Keshig were flooded with Chinese recruits. The suwei were initially 6,500 strong but by the end of the dynasty it had become 100,000 strong. They were divided into wei or guards, each recruited from a particular ethnicity. Most wei were Chinese, while a few were Mongols, Koreans, Tungusic peoples, Kipchaks and Europeans/Middle Easterners including Alans and even one unit of Russians. The Keshig was converted into an administrative organisation instead.

Units

Primary units
Torguud (Tunghaut) are the day guard of the Mongol khans. They were always close to their rulers during their conquests or daily-life. Famous Subutai was in the kheshig in his early years.
Khevtuul are the night guard of the Kheshig, and were tasked with protecting the emperors and rulers while they slept in their yurt. The name "khevtuul", literally means "ones that are lying" on something like a bed or floor in the Mongolian language, implying that they have something to do with night time.

Supplementary units
Khorchin were a battle guard of the Khagans. The word Khorchin refers to quiver bearers. Scholars believe that the Mongolian clan Khorchin is related to them.
Asud guard. They consisted fully of Alans from northern Caucasus. At first, they served the Mongol monarchs as auxiliaries in battle after the Mongol invasion of Volga Bulgaria in 1236. The Great Khan Kublai organized them into the imperial guard. Their descendants formed the modern Mongolian tribe, Asud
Ever-faithful Russian life-guard. One of Kublai's successors, Tugh Temür formed a unit of Russians near Dadu in 1330.
Kipchak and Qanqli guards. Sometime after 1216 Kipchak and Qanqli prisoners served the Mongols in North China as warriors and kharchins (clarified fermented mare's milk makers). Under Kublai Khan, the Kipchaks formed special guards corps, and the Qanqli guard was formed in 1308.

Descent
Many elements in the Mughal Empire shared similar heritage to the Mongols. Such examples are Babur, who was a direct descendant of Timur and Genghis Khan through his father and mother respectively.

The Kheshgi family, an imperial dynasty of Pashtun origin that played important roles throughout Mughal era, are believed to be descendants of the Kheshig who originated in the surrounding areas of Zamand and Keshik in Iran.

The modern Mongolian Khishigten clan are also believed to be their descendants, who now inhabit Heshigten Banner within Inner Mongolia in China.

In popular culture
The Kheshig serve as a unique unit for the Mongolian civilizations in Sid Meier's Civilization IV and Sid Meier's Civilization VI: Rise and Fall.
The Kheshig also appears as one of the unique units for the Tatars civilization in Age of Empires II: Definitive Edition, as well as a ranged cavalry part of Ming and Mongolian Banner armies of the Chinese civilization in Age of Empires III: The Asian Dynasties. The Kheshig is also one of the noble Khuzait units in  Mount & Blade II: Bannerlord.

In the BattleTech universe, a Keshik is the personal unit of a Clan's Khan, a combination of bodyguard and command staff, its usage coming from the Mongol influences in the Clans' military terminology.

See also
 Mongol Empire
Mongol military tactics and organization
Society of the Mongol Empire
Organization of state under Genghis Khan
Shi
Samurai
Hwarang

References

External links
 Great Mongol Empire
 Mongol State Structure and Organization

Bodyguards
Former guards regiments
Military history of the Mongol Empire
Mongol Empire
Protective security units
Royal guards